Louis S. Viverito is a former Democratic member of the Illinois Senate, representing the 11th district from 1995 until his resignation in 2011.

Public service
Viverito served in the Korean War, and is a three-time decorated veteran. In 1969, Viverito began his career in public service when he was elected Stickney Township Democratic Committeeman. Viverito was later elected as a delegate in the 1972 Democratic Convention.

Since 1973, Viverito served as the Supervisor of Stickney Township and President of Stickney Township's Public Health District. He succeeded Howard T. Scheulin, who chose not to seek re-election. Viverito also worked as a Commissioner of the Metropolitan Sanitary District of Greater Chicago (now the Water Reclamation District) from 1980 to 1986. He was later appointed as a member of the Cook County Zoning Board of Appeals.

Viverito is active in many community organizations. His positions include Local Chairman of the Chicago Lung Association and former Chairman of the Burbank Chamber of Commerce. Currently, Viverito is an associate member for the Crisis Center of South Suburbia for Abused Women, a life member of the Veterans of Foreign Wars, a member of the American Legion and a former member of the Moraine Valley Community College Economic Development Board.

Senate career
Viverito was elected in 1994 as state senator. Viverito served as Minority Whip for the Senate Democratic Caucus for two years; in 2001 he was selected to serve as Assistant Majority Leader. He is a popular senator.

Viverito was named Democratic Legislator of the Year in 2000 by the Illinois State Crime Commission and Outstanding Legislator in 1999 by the Illinois Health Care Association.

Viverito served on seven committees: Appropriations II, Executive Subcommittee of Licensed Activities, Executive Subcommittee for State and Local Government, Executive, Executive Appointments, Mobile Homes, and Rules.

In June 2007, Viverito was told by Democratic Senate President Emil Jones that he was not welcome in a closed-door Senate meeting and was replaced on the Senate Rules Committee, allegedly due to Viverito's loyalty to Jones' rival, House Speaker Michael Madigan, whose district largely overlaps Viverito's.

Viverito sponsored a bill raising the eligibility threshold for senior citizens qualifying for the senior citizens property tax assessment freeze. This law helps more individuals qualify for an assessment freeze by raising the income threshold from $35,000 to $40,000. This caps the annual increases on the property tax assessment of the homes of individuals 65 years or older who have applied for the freeze.

Personal life
Viverito and his wife, Carolyn, have three children and five grandchildren.

References

External links
Illinois General Assembly - Senator Louis Viverito (D) 11th District official IL Senate website
Bills Committees
Follow the Money - Louis S Viverito
2006 2004 2002 2000 1998 1996 campaign contributions
Illinois State Senate Democrats - Senator Louis S. Viverito profile

Living people
Democratic Party Illinois state senators
Politicians from Chicago
Military personnel from Illinois
Year of birth missing (living people)
21st-century American politicians